Public works are a broad category of infrastructure projects, financed and constructed by the government, for recreational, employment, and health and safety uses in the greater community. They include public buildings (municipal buildings, schools, and hospitals), transport infrastructure (roads, railroads, bridges, pipelines, canals, ports, and airports), public spaces (public squares, parks, and beaches), public services (water supply and treatment, sewage treatment, electrical grid, and dams), and other, usually long-term, physical assets and facilities. Though often interchangeable with public infrastructure and public capital, public works does not necessarily carry an economic component, thereby being a broader term.

Public works has been encouraged since antiquity. For example, the Roman emperor Nero encouraged the construction of various infrastructure projects during widespread deflation.

Overview 
Public works is a multi-dimensional concept in economics and politics, touching on multiple arenas including: recreation (parks, beaches, trails), aesthetics (trees, green space), economy (goods and people movement, energy), law (police and courts), and neighborhood (community centers, social services buildings). It represents any constructed object that augments a nation's physical infrastructure.

Municipal infrastructure, urban infrastructure, and rural development usually represent the same concept but imply either large cities or developing nations' concerns respectively.  The terms public infrastructure or critical infrastructure are at times used interchangeably. However, critical infrastructure includes public works (dams, waste water systems, bridges, etc.) as well as facilities like hospitals, banks, and telecommunications systems and views them from a national security viewpoint and the impact on the community that the loss of such facilities would entail.

Furthermore, the term public works has recently been expanded to include digital public infrastructure projects. For example, in the United States, the first nationwide digital public works project is an effort to create an open source software platform for e-voting (created and managed by the Open Source Digital Voting Foundation).

Reflecting increased concern with sustainability, urban ecology and quality of life, efforts to move towards sustainable municipal infrastructure are common in developed nations, especially in the European Union and Canada (where the FCM InfraGuide provides an officially mandated best practice exchange to move municipalities in that direction).

Public works programmes 
A public employment programme or public works programme is the provision of employment by the creation of predominantly public goods at a prescribed wage for those unable to find alternative employment. This functions as a form of social safety net. Public works programmes are activities which entail the payment of a wage (in cash or in kind) by the state, or by an Agent (or cash-for work/CFW). One particular form of public works, that of offering a short-term period of employment, has come to dominate practice, particularly in regions such as Sub-Saharan Africa. Applied in the short term, this is appropriate as a response to transient shocks and acute labour market crises.

Investing in public works projects in order to stimulate the general economy has been a popular policy measure since the economic crisis of the 1930s. Spearheaded by U.S. Secretary of Labor Frances Perkins, the first female Cabinet member in the United States, the New Deal resulted in the creation of programs such as the Civilian Conservation Corps, Public Works Administration, and the Works Progress Administration, among others, all of which created public goods through labor and infrastructure investments.

More recent examples are the 2008–2009 Chinese economic stimulus program, India’s National Infrastructure Pipeline of 2020, the 2008 European Union stimulus plan, and the American Recovery and Reinvestment Act of 2009.

Utility of investment 
While it is argued that capital investment in public works can be used to reduce unemployment, opponents of internal improvement programs argue that such projects should be undertaken by the private sector, not the public sector, because public works projects are often inefficient and costly to taxpayers. Further, some argue that public works, when used excessively by a government, are characteristic of socialism and other totalitarian or collectivist forms of government because of their 'tax and spend' policies and excessive bureaucracy. However, in the private sector, entrepreneurs bear their own losses and so private-sector firms are generally unwilling to undertake projects that could result in losses or would not develop a revenue stream. Governments will invest in public works because of the overall benefit to society when there is a lack of private sector benefit (a project that does generate revenue) or the risk is too great for a private company to accept on its own.

According to research conducted at the Aalborg University, 86% of public works projects end up with cost overruns. Some unexpected findings of the research were the following:
 Technically-difficult projects were not more likely to exceed the budget than less difficult projects.
 Projects in which more people were directly and indirectly affected by the project turned out to be more susceptible to cost overruns.
 Project managers generally did not learn from similar projects attempted in the past.

Generally, contracts awarded by public tenders include a provision for unexpected expenses (cost overruns), which typically amount to 10% of the value of the contract.  This money is spent during the course of the project only if the construction managers judge that it is necessary, and the expenditure must typically be justified in writing.

See also
Contingencies fund
Department of transportation
Utility district
Infrastructure
Internal improvements
Public good, an economic discussion
Madaket Ditch, one of the first public works projects in America
E-procurement

Individual programs
Egyptian Public Works
New Deal
Opera Publica
Public Works Administration

External links

 American Public Works Association - Professional society

References

"Political Economy of Very Large Space Projects", Journal of Evolution and Technology. vol. 4. November 1999.

Civil engineering
Fiscal policy
Infrastructure
Public economics
Public works ministries
Domestic policy